The Hong Kong Film Award for Best Editing is an award presented annually at the Hong Kong Film Awards for best editing in a Hong Kong film. As of 2018 the current holder is Li Ka Wing for Chasing The Dragon.

Winners and nominees

References

External links
 Hong Kong Film Awards Official Site

Hong Kong Film Awards